Angela Quentina Arnold (born September 10, 1996), better known by the ring name A. Q. A., is an American retired professional wrestler. She began to work with Booker T's Reality of Wrestling promotion in 2018. She also worked for All Elite Wrestling (AEW) in 2022 and WWE in 2021 as Zayda Ramier.

Professional wrestling career 
Arnold was trained by Booker T in his promotion Reality of Wrestling. During her years in the promotion, she won the women's title, ROW Diamonds Division Championship twice. On June 18, 2022, AQA challenged Athena for the Warrior Wrestling Women's Championship but lost.

On March 31, 2021, Arnold, going by the ring name Zayda Ramier, made her WWE debut competing on NXT, in a tag team match facing The Way (Candice LeRae and Indi Hartwell) teaming with Gigi Dolin which they lost. On the April 27 episode of NXT, Ramier faced Toni Storm and won the match making this her first win in WWE. In July Ramier was medically disqualified to wrestle for the company despite her debating to the WWE medics that the reason she felt she was going pass out was due to dehydration. On November 4 Ramier was released by WWE.

On February 9, 2022, AQA made her debut in All Elite Wrestling on Dynamite where she faced Jade Cargill for the AEW TBS championship which AQA lost. Two days later Tony Khan announced that she was signed to the company, but six months later, on July 18, AQA announced she is stepping away from professional wrestling "for the immediate future" as it has taken a mental and physical strain on her.

Championships and accomplishments
Reality of Wrestling
ROW Diamonds Division Championship (2 times)

References

External links 
 
 
 

1996 births
21st-century professional wrestlers
American female professional wrestlers
African-American female professional wrestlers
Living people
Professional wrestlers from Alabama
People from Choctaw County, Alabama